"Lost in You" is the fourth and final single released from Three Days Grace's third album, Life Starts Now. The song was released for radio airplay on February 1, 2011. Much like "Never Too Late", it was a crossover song to top 40 radio. The song is also the band's first entry into adult contemporary stations; the first stations being on CFIT-FM Calgary, CKSY-FM Chatham-Kent, CJRL-FM Kenora and WNIC Detroit.

Background
"Lost in You" is considered somewhat unusual for the band. The song expresses a more affectionate sentiment than is typically found in the band's music. While electric guitars still play a prominent role, the focus is on Adam Gontier's voice and the melody. 

The lyrics are bittersweet as Gontier sings about a love that has its ups and downs. 

On March 15, 2011, the band released an EP, via online download, containing the piano version of "World So Cold" and a cover of the Fleetwood Mac song "The Chain" in promotion of "Lost in You".

The song won a BDS Certified Spin Award based on the 50,000 spins it received in 2011. The song also won the "Pop/Rock Music Award" at the 2012 SOCAN Awards.

Personnel
 Adam Gontier – lead vocals, rhythm guitar
 Neil Sanderson – drums, backing vocals
 Brad Walst – bass guitar
 Barry Stock – lead guitar

EP track listing
 "Lost in You"
 "World So Cold" (piano version)
 "The Chain" (Fleetwood Mac cover)

Charts

Weekly charts

Year-end charts

Accolades

References

2009 songs
2011 singles
Songs written by Adam Gontier
Three Days Grace songs
Song recordings produced by Howard Benson
Jive Records singles